Thomas Geyer (born 6 March 1991) is a German footballer who plays for Regionalliga Südwest club SSV Ulm 1846.

References

External links
 
 
 

1991 births
Living people
German footballers
VfB Stuttgart II players
SV Wehen Wiesbaden players
VfR Aalen players
SSV Ulm 1846 players
3. Liga players
Association football defenders